The 2022–23 Clemson Tigers women's basketball team will represent Clemson University during the 2022–23 college basketball season. The Tigers will be led by fifth year head coach Amanda Butler. The Tigers, members of the Atlantic Coast Conference, play their home games at Littlejohn Coliseum.

Previous season
The Tigers finished the season 10–21 and 3–15 in ACC play to finish in thirteenth place.  In the ACC tournament, they defeated twelfth seeded Syracuse in the First Round before losing to fifth seed Virginia Tech in the Second Round. They were not invited to the NCAA tournament or the WNIT.

Offseason

Departures

Incoming Transfers

2022 recruiting class

Source:

Roster
Source:

Schedule
Source: 

|- 
!colspan=9 style=""| Regular Season

|-
!colspan=9 style=""| ACC Women's Tournament

|-
!colspan=9 style=""| WNIT

Rankings

See also
 2022–23 Clemson Tigers men's basketball team

References

Clemson Tigers women's basketball seasons
Clemson
Clemson Tigers
Clemson Tigers
2023 Women's National Invitation Tournament participants